David Fletcher Hewlett Parker (born July 5, 1940) was a Canadian politician. He served in the Legislative Assembly of British Columbia from 1987 to 1991, as a Social Credit member for the constituency of Skeena.

Before entering politics he was a professional forester, he was elected as a School Board trustee, serving Golden from 1981 to 1983 and then Terrace from 1985 to 1987.  He was elected to the British Columbia Legislature as MLA for Skeena in October 1986.

He served as Minister of Forests and Lands and Minister of State for the North Coast Region in the Rita Johnston and Bill Vander Zalm governments.

References

1940 births
Living people
British Columbia school board members
British Columbia Social Credit Party MLAs
Canadian foresters
Members of the Executive Council of British Columbia
People from Halifax, Nova Scotia